Surveyor General of Queensland is a position originally created for the colony of Queensland, now a state of Australia. The position was the most senior surveyor within the Queensland Public Service.

List of Surveyors General of Queensland

See also
 Surveyor General of New South Wales
 Surveyor General of South Australia
 Surveyor General of Tasmania
 Surveyor General of the Northern Territory
 Surveyor General of Victoria
 Surveyor General of Western Australia

References

Lists of British, Australian and New Zealand Surveyors-General, Government Geologists...
Australian Dictionary of Biography Surveyor-General search

External links